The 1914 college football season had no clear-cut champion, with the Official NCAA Division I Football Records Book listing Army, Illinois, and Texas as having been selected national champions. Only Illinois claims a national championship for the 1914 season.

Conference program and changes

Conference changes
Three conferences began football play in 1914:
Oklahoma Intercollegiate Conference – active through the 1928 season; one of two conferences to bear this name, the second would be active between 1974 and 1996
Hawkeye College Conference – active through the 1917 season
Kentucky Intercollegiate Athletic Association – active through the 1916 season

Membership changes

Program changes
 After reinstating their football program after a 3-year hiatus, the University of Southern California Methodists officially changed their nickname to the now-eponymous Trojans.

Stadiums

Final Season
 Alabama plays their final season at The Quad. The Quad has been Alabama's home field since their first home game in 1893. The final game at The Quad was a 21–3 victory over Chattanooga on 11/13/1914. For 1915, Alabama would move into University Field on the southern edge of campus.

Conference standings

Major conference standings

Independents

Minor conferences

Minor conference standings

Awards and honors

All-Americans

The consensus All-America team included:

Statistical leaders
 Player scoring most points: Buck Mayer, Virginia, 142

References